Tanja Szewczenko (born 26 July 1977) is a German former figure skater and occasional actress. She is the 1994 World bronze medalist, 1997 Champions Series Final silver medalist, 1998 European bronze medalist, and 1993 World Junior bronze medalist.

Personal life 

Szewczenko was born to Vera Küke, an ethnic German immigrant from the Soviet Union, and a Ukrainian father who left the family when she was two years old.

Competitive career 
Szewczenko won the bronze medal at the 1993 World Junior Championships.

In 1993, at the age of 16, Szewczenko won her first international competition at the Nations Cup in Germany, defeating the reigning world champion Oksana Baiul. A few weeks later, she won her first national title, defeating former Olympic champion Katarina Witt. Szewczenko competed at the 1994 Winter Olympics in Lillehammer, Norway. During a practice session before the long program, she collided with Oksana Baiul, sustaining a bruised right hip and abdomen. She finished 6th at the event. Szewczenko won a bronze medal at the 1994 World Championships.

After finishing 6th at the 1996 Worlds, Szewczenko struggled for 18 months with a pair of viral infections which caused her to sleep 18 hours a day. She made a comeback in late 1997, winning on home ice at the 1997 Sparkassen Cup on Ice in Gelsenkirchen, Germany over eventual World champion, Irina Slutskaya. She went on to defeat former World champion Chen Lu and eventual World champion Maria Butyrskaya at the 1997 NHK Trophy in Nagano, Japan, and in doing so, earned a spot to the 1997–98 Champions Series Final in Munich, Germany. She won the silver medal behind American Tara Lipinski. Her tonsils were removed in December 1997.

Szewczenko won a bronze medal at the 1998 European Championships in Milan, Italy. She contracted a severe flu at the 1998 Winter Olympics in Nagano, Japan, and withdrew from the event. She finished 9th at the 1998 World Championships in Minneapolis, Minnesota a month later.

Szewczenko retired from competitive figure skating in 2000 to concentrate on modelling and acting. She is the last German ladies' singles skater to medal at an ISU Championships.

Later career 
Szewczenko posed for the German edition of Playboy magazine in April 1999 and March 2007. Beginning in 2002, she played the role of Katinka "Kati" Ritter on the German soap opera Unter uns. Her last appearance on the soap was 5 December 2005. From September 2006 until 2009, Szewczenko appeared in the German soap opera Alles was zählt on RTL Television. She played the role of Diana Sommer, an inline courier, who trained as a figure skater alongside the wealthy daughter of a fitness center mogul. Norman Jeschke played her pair skating partner. In January 2009, Szewczenko left the series to return to show skating, joining the Holiday on Ice show with Jeschke.

Personal life

Szewczenko and Norman Jeschke have a daughter who was born in February 2011 and twin sons who were born in April 2021.

Programs

Results
GP: Champions Series (Grand Prix)

References

External links

 

1977 births
Living people
Figure skaters at the 1994 Winter Olympics
German television actresses
German female single skaters
Olympic figure skaters of Germany
Sportspeople from Düsseldorf
German people of Ukrainian descent
German people of Russian descent
World Figure Skating Championships medalists
European Figure Skating Championships medalists
World Junior Figure Skating Championships medalists